Ferry to Hong Kong is a 1959 British melodrama/adventure film directed by Lewis Gilbert and starring Curt Jürgens, Sylvia Syms, Orson Welles and Jeremy Spenser.

Plot
Mark Conrad, a debonair Anglo-Austrian former playboy and junk owner, now an alcoholic down-and-out, is expelled from Hong Kong. He is placed on an ancient ferry boat, the Fa Tsan (known to its crew as the Fat Annie), despite the protests of the pompous owner, Captain Cecil Hart.

He travels to Macau, but is refused entry for the same reason he was expelled from Hong Kong. He engages the captain in a card game and wins the right to 'live' on board. His charming manner endears him to the crew and to an attractive teacher Liz Ferrers, a regular passenger.

The ferry is nearly wrecked in a typhoon, but Conrad wrests command from the cowardly and drunken captain and saves the ship. Drifting out of control near the Chinese coast, they are boarded by pirates, led by Chinese-American Johnny Sing-up. Sing-up reveals that Hart is a former conman who won the ship in a crooked card-game.

Conrad becomes a hero when he saves the ship, and is allowed to stay in Hong Kong. He is tempted to continue his budding relationship with Liz, but decides to resist it until
he has 'beaten the dragon'.

Cast
 Curt Jürgens as Mark Bertram Conrad
 Orson Welles as Captain Cecil Hart
 Sylvia Syms as Miss Liz Ferrers
 Jeremy Spenser as Miguel Henriques, 1st Officer
 Noel Purcell as Joe Skinner, ship's engineer
 Margaret Withers as Miss Carter
 John Wallace as Hong Kong Police Inspector
 Roy Chiao as Johnny Sing-up
 Shelley Shen as Foo Soo
 Louis Seto as Tommy Cheng
 Milton Reid as Yen, Sing-Up's Partner

Background
The film was based on a 1957 novel by Simon Kent. In August 1958 Rank announced they were to make a film version starring Peter Finch.

The film was among those movies made by Rank to appeal to the international market, involving colour and location filming. Rank had rationalised its film production arm, decreasing overall output but putting more money in a certain number of films. Rank chairman John Davis said: "It is vital that the greatest possible financial encouragement should be given to the making of important films: for these the public will gladly pay. The emphasis will be on the more expensive and important film."

The film was to originally star Burl Ives and contract star Peter Finch. However this soon became Curt Jurgens and Orson Welles. (A number of Rank movies had German stars around this time as the German market was seen as very important.) Jurgen's fee was a reported £55,000.

The original title was Night Ferry to Hong Kong. The movie had one of the largest budgets in the history of Rank.

Lewis Gilbert described Ferry to Hong Kong as "my nightmare film". Orson Welles, he said, "never cared about his fellow actors, never cared about the director". Gilbert says "everything was wrong with the film - principally Orson Welles".

Orson Welles said he would only do the film if it was turned into a comedy. He said this led to clashes with Jurgens who played the material straight while Welles played it as a farce.

Originally Jurgens was meant to play the ship captain and Welles the tramp but John Davis, head of Rank, insisted they change roles. The film was shot entirely on location. In Hong Kong the production team bought a boat that could be converted into a paddle steamer and used local labour to build a full sized studio stage and crane for the CinemaScope camera. The film was shot with guide tracks and every line of dialogue was re-recorded and re-synched in Pinewood. Welles and Jurgens hated each other and Gilbert had trouble filming them in the same shot. Welles insisted on wearing a false nose and at one point held up filming for two days while he could find his nose.

Filming started 10 November 1958.

Reception
The film received bad reviews in England and was a disaster at the box office.

Critical
The Los Angeles Times called it "a very funny comedy-drama".

Variety said "the most fascinating aspect of this slice of meller-hokum is the way Orson Welles has clearly conned director Lewis Gilbert; Welles seems to have been allowed to write his own dialog and give his own interpretation of his role. He might just as well have taken, over direction. The result is a piece of hammy; over-acting which might have been fun for a few minutes. But, carried on for around two hours remorselessly, it becomes grotesque arid,; in the end a boring, caricature."

Filmink called it "a complete turkey with Syms having to act her arse off to convince us that she’s attracted to sweaty, tubby Curt Jurgens."

References

External links
 

1959 films
1959 adventure films
British adventure films
Films directed by Lewis Gilbert
Films shot at Pinewood Studios
Seafaring films
Films set in Hong Kong
Films set in Macau
20th Century Fox films
1950s English-language films
1950s British films